Caleb Kelly may refer to:

Caleb Kelly (curator) (born 1972), New Zealand curator
Caleb Kelly (American football) (born 1998), American football linebacker